Sheila Seebaluck (born 13 December 1964) is a Mauritian middle-distance runner. She competed in the women's 800 metres at the 1988 Summer Olympics.

References

1964 births
Living people
Athletes (track and field) at the 1988 Summer Olympics
Mauritian female middle-distance runners
Olympic athletes of Mauritius
Athletes (track and field) at the 1990 Commonwealth Games
Athletes (track and field) at the 1994 Commonwealth Games
Commonwealth Games competitors for Mauritius
Place of birth missing (living people)